Quickspace is the debut album released by London-based experimental rock band  Quickspace. The album was initially released in 1996 on their own Kitty Kitty Corporation label, and then re-released on 18 November 1997 for the USA market through Slash Records, with a slightly different track listing and revised art work.

Track listing

References 

1996 albums
Quickspace albums